The 20th Annual European Film Awards took place on 1 December 2007 in Berlin, Germany.

Winners and nominees

European Film of the Year

European Director
  Fatih Akin (Auf Der Anderen Seite)
  Roy Andersson (Du Levande)
  Stephen Frears (The Queen)
  Kevin Macdonald (The Last King of Scotland)
  Giuseppe Tornatore (La Sconosciuta)
  Cristian Mungiu (4 Luni, 3 Saptamini Si 2 Zile)

European Actress
  Marion Cotillard (La Môme)
  Marianne Faithfull (Irina Palm)
  Carice van Houten (Zwartboek)
  Anamaria Marinca (4 Luni, 3 Saptamini Si 2 Zile)
  Helen Mirren (The Queen)
  Ksenia Rappoport (La Sconosciuta)

European Actor
 Sasson Gabai - Bikur Ha-Tizmoret (The Band's Visit)
 Elio Germano - Mio fratello è figlio unico (My Brother Is an Only Child)
  James McAvoy - The Last King of Scotland
  Miki Manojlović - Irina Palm
  Michel Piccoli - Belle Toujours
  Ben Whishaw - Das Parfum: Die Geschichte Eines Mörders (Perfume: The Story of a Murderer)

European Cinematographer
  Anthony Dod Mantle (The Last King of Scotland)
  Frank Griebe (Das Parfum – Die Geschichte Eines Mörders)
  Mikhail Krichman (Izgnanie)
 Fabio Zamarion (La Sconosciuta)

European Screenwriter
  Fatih Akin (Auf Der Anderen Seite)
  Eran Kolirin (Bikur Ha-Tizmoret)
  Peter Morgan (The Queen)
  Cristian Mungiu (4 Luni, 3 Saptamini Si 2 Zile)

European Composer
  Alexandre Desplat (The Queen)
  Alex Heffes (The Last King of Scotland)
  Dejan Pejovic (Gucha)
  Tom Tykwer, Johnny Klimek and Reinhold Heil (Das Parfum – Die Geschichte Eines Mörders)

European Film Academy Prix d'Excellence
  Uli Hanisch for Production Design in (Das Parfum – Die Geschichte Eines Mörders)
  Annette Focks, Jörg Höhne, Robin Pohle and Andreas Ruft for Sound Effects in (Vier Minuten)
  Didier Lavergne for Make up in (La Môme)
  Francesca Sartori for Costume in (Alatriste)
  Lucia Zucchetti for Editing in (The Queen)

European Discovery 2007
 Bikur Ha-Tizmoret (The Band's Visit) by Eran Kolirin
 Control by Anton Corbijn
 Gegenüber (Counterparts) by Jan Bonny
 Takva (A Man's Fear of God) by Özer Kiziltan

European Documentary - Prix ARTE
/ Am Limit (To the Limit) by Pepe Danquart
 Belarusian Waltz by Andrzej Fidyk
 Forever by Heddy Honigmann
/ Heitmatklänge (Echoes of Home) by Stefan Schwietert
 Le papier ne peut pas envelopper la braise (Paper cannot Wrap up Embers) by Rithy Panh
 Malon 9 Kohavim (9 Star Hotel) by Ido Haar
/ Meragel Hashampaniya (The Champagne Spy) by Nadav Schirman
 Ou Est L’amour Dans La Palmeraie? (Where is the Love in the Palmgrove?) by Jérôme Le Maire
 Razvod Po Albanski (Divorce at the Albanian Style) by Adela Peeva
 The Monastery  by Pernille Rose Grønkjær

European Shortfilm - Prix UIP
Prix UIP Ghent:  Kwiz by Renaud Callebaut
Prix UIP Valladolid:  Le Diner by Cécile Vernant
Prix UIP Angers:  Adjustment by Ian Mackinnon
Prix UIP Rotterdam: // Amin by David Dusa
Prix UIP Berlin:  Rotten Apple by Ralitza Petrova
Prix UIP Tampere:  Dreams and Desires - Family Ties by Joanna Quinn
Prix UIP Cracow:  Dad by Daniel Mulloy
Prix UIP Grimstad:  Tommy by Ole Giæver
Prix UIP Vila Do Conde:  Plot Point by Nicolas Provost
Prix UIP Edinburgh:  Soft by Simon Ellis
Prix UIP Sarajevo:  Tokyo Jim by Jamie Rafn
Prix UIP Venezia:  Alumbramiento by Eduardo Chapero-Jackson
Prix UIP Drama:  Salvador by Abdelatif Hwidar

People's Choice Award
2 Days in Paris by Julie Delpy
12:08 East of Bucharest by Corneliu Porumboiu
Alatriste by Agustín Díaz Yanes
Black Book by Paul Verhoeven
I Served the King of England by Jiří Menzel
The Last King of Scotland by Kevin Macdonald
Perfume by Tom Tykwer
The Queen by Stephen Frears
Reprise by Joachim Trier
La Sconosciuta by Giuseppe Tornatore
La Môme by Olivier Dahan

External links
Official site
the 2007 European Film Awards Selection List

2007 film awards
European Film Awards ceremonies
Culture in Berlin
2007 in Europe
2007 in Berlin
2007 in German cinema